Jade Hanzel Dimapilis Lopez-Siccion (born October 22, 1987) is a Filipina actress and businesswoman. A former Seventeen Best Female Model, she entered Philippine showbiz through the first wave of StarStruck and became a finalist.

Personal life
In 2018, Lopez married her non-showbiz fiancé, Rocky Siccion at Manila Cathedral. She gave birth to a daughter, Rinoa Sapphire, on 26th February 2020. On 13th September 2021, GMA News announced that Lopez is pregnant with another child.

Filmography

Television

Film

References

External links

1987 births
Living people
People from Tanauan, Batangas
Actresses from Batangas
Filipino child actresses
Filipino film actresses
Filipino television actresses
Participants in Philippine reality television series
StarStruck (Philippine TV series) participants
GMA Network personalities
San Beda University alumni
Filipina gravure idols